The Benjamin Harrison School from Cayey is a school that belongs to Puerto Rico's public school system.

Location
Benjamin Harrison Vocational School is a school located at PR-14 - José de Diego Avenue in Cayey.

History
After the occupation of the United States in Puerto Rico and identifying illiteracy as one of the main problems in the island, the government developed a program for the construction of schools among other projects.

The Benjamin Harrison School was finished by October 23, 1902 with a total cost of $8,600.00 invested in its construction.

Architecture 
The original design of the school was a two-floor building in a rectangular shape with a gabled roof, similar to Washington's Graduate School from Guayama.

It had four classrooms, a basement, and an attic. The attic was an extra floor that was built in order to get the best of the space provided beneath the gabled roof. In the front, it had two stairways providing an enormous balcony connecting two superior classrooms. The first floor had a carcade (corridor) or a hallway that connected the front yard through four stairways. The school had an enormous backyard for the students where their sanitary facilities, a latrine,  where placed for the female students and the male students.

Notable alumni 
Danny Ortiz (baseball)
Miguel Pereira Castillo
Joseph O. Prewitt Díaz

References 

Educational institutions established in 1902
Schools in Puerto Rico
Cayey, Puerto Rico
1902 establishments in Puerto Rico